Johanna Doris Moore FRSE is a computational linguist and cognitive scientist. Her research publications include contributions to natural language generation, spoken dialogue systems, computational models of discourse, intelligent tutoring and training systems, human-computer interaction, user modeling, and knowledge representation.

Education
She received a BS in Mathematics and Computer Science (summa cum laude) in 1980, an MS in Computer Science in 1982, and PhD (Advisors: William Swartout, Gerald Estrin) in 1989, all from UCLA.

Career
Moore has held posts at UCLA (1976–1986), USC Information Sciences Institute (1983–1989), and the University of Pittsburgh (1990–1998).

Since 1998 she has held the Chair in Artificial Intelligence within the School of Informatics at the University of Edinburgh. She has served as Director of the Human Communication Research Centre, and as Co-Director of the Institute for Language, Cognition and Computation.

From 2014-2018 she was head of the School of Informatics and in 2016 instigated the Blockchain Technology Laboratory. She was succeeded as head of the school by Professor Jane Hillston. She is ranked as one of the top 10 computer scientists at Edinburgh with a H-index of 58.

Awards and honours
Moore was elected to the UCLA chapter of Phi Beta Kappa in 1980. She held an Office of Naval Research Fellowship from 1982 to 1985, and was an IBM Fellow from 1985 to 1987. She held a National Science Foundation National Young Investigator Award, from 1994 to 1999. She has been Chair of the Cognitive Science Society, and was President of the Association for Computational Linguistics in 2004.

She is a Fellow of the British Computer Society. In 2003 she was elected a Fellow of the Royal Society of Edinburgh.

Research projects

Moore is carrying out a research project from June 2015 to May 2016 on Connected Digital Economy.

References

External links
Johanna Moore's home page
 Planning text for advisory dialogues: capturing intentional and rhetorical information

Year of birth missing (living people)
Living people
Academics of the University of Edinburgh
Fellows of the Royal Society of Edinburgh
Fellows of the British Computer Society
British computer scientists
University of California, Los Angeles alumni
University of Southern California faculty
University of Pittsburgh faculty
British women computer scientists
Computational linguistics researchers
IBM Fellows
Presidents of the Association for Computational Linguistics